The 2020 Asian Beach Volleyball Championship was a beach volleyball event, that was held from 13 to 16 February, 2020 in Udon Thani, Thailand.

Medal summary

Participating nations

Men

 (3)
 (3)
 (3)
 (3)
 (3)
 (3)
 (3)
 (1)
 (1)
 (2)
 (1)
 (4)

Women

 (3)
 (3)
 (2)
 (2)
 (3)
 (2)
 (2)
 (4)
 (2)

Men's tournament

Preliminary round

Pool A 

|}

Pool B 

|}

Pool C 

|}

Pool D 

|}

Pool E 

|}

Pool F 

|}

Pool G 

|}

Pool H 

|}

Knockout round

Women's tournament

Preliminary round

Pool A 

|}

Pool B 

|}

Pool C 

|}

Pool D 

|}

Pool E 

|}

Pool F 

|}

Pool G 

|}

Pool H 

|}

Knockout round

References
Results

External links

2020
Asian Championships
Beach volleyball
2020 Asian Beach Volleyball Championships